Aimes Green is a Hamlet in Essex, England. It is near the hamlet of Holyfield and the town of Waltham Abbey.

References 
A-Z Essex, 2010 edition. p. 62.

Hamlets in Essex
Epping Forest District